The Maharajah Jungle Trek is a themed wildlife trail attraction at Disney's Animal Kingdom theme park at the Walt Disney World Resort in Lake Buena Vista, Florida. It is in the Asia themed land, the Kingdom of Anandapur. It shares this area with the Kali River Rapids white water raft ride and the Expedition Everest runaway train rollercoaster.

Story
The trail is themed as if it had once been the hunting grounds for a wealthy maharajah who enclosed the forest to allow for easier hunting and then some time later died in a hunting accident. The themed storyline continues with subsequent maharajahs (including the original maharajah's bachelor brother) transforming the area into a nature preserve where the villagers live in harmony with the animals therein. These maharajahs are memorialized on the walls of the tiger enclosure. The forest was, at one point, also run by imperial British visitors, as evidenced in the Western spelling on the sign at the entrance to the Jungle Trek, which reads "Royal Anandapoor Forest". The Asian animals include tigers, Komodo dragons, Eld's deer, blackbucks, flying foxes, water buffaloes, lion-tailed macaques, and various Asian birds. When their occupation of southern Asia ended, the British turned the forest over to the villagers of Anandapur, whom you encounter as you walk through the jungle. The trail's storyline also includes an homage to the founder of the Kingdom of Anandapur, Anantah, in the form of a tomb and sarcophagus situated at the entrance to the Jungle Trek's aviary.

Animal encounters
On the Maharajah Jungle Trek one may see:
Komodo dragon
Lion-tailed macaque
Black tree monitor
Malayan flying fox
Prehensile-tailed skink
Sumatran tiger
Blackbuck
Eld's deer
Water buffalo
Bar-headed goose
Sarus crane

Aviary

 Metallic starling
 Masked lapwing
 Falcated teal
 Grey-capped emerald dove
 Great argus
 Cotton pygmy goose
 Mindanao bleeding-heart
 Nicobar pigeon
 Pied imperial pigeon
 Victoria crowned pigeon
 Black-collared starling
 Golden-crested myna
 Crested wood partridge
 Blue-crowned laughingthrush
 White-rumped shama
 Hooded pitta
 Asian fairy-bluebird

History 

In 2015, three water buffalo named Rose, Dorothy and Blanche, were added to the attraction.  Their names were inspired by the TV show The Golden Girls.  A new pool was constructed specifically for these animals.

In 2017, Jeda and Anala, the first Sumatran tiger cubs ever born at Animal Kingdom were featured here for public viewing.

External links 
 Walt Disney World Resort - Maharajah Jungle Trek

References

Disney's Animal Kingdom 
Asia (Disney's Animal Kingdom)
Walt Disney Parks and Resorts attractions
1999 establishments in Florida